Henequen (Agave fourcroydes) is a species of flowering plant in the family Asparagaceae, native to southern Mexico and Guatemala. It is reportedly naturalized in Italy, the Canary Islands, Costa Rica, Cuba, Hispaniola, the Cayman Islands and the Lesser Antilles.

Overview

The leaves of Agave fourcroydes yield a fiber also called henequen, which is suitable for rope and twine but not of as high a quality as sisal. It is the major plantation fiber agave of eastern Mexico, being grown extensively in Yucatán, Veracruz, and Tamaulipas. It is also used to make licor del henequén, a traditional Mexican alcoholic drink.

The plant appears as a rosette of sword-shaped leaves 1.2 to 1.8 meters long, growing out of a thick stem that may reach 1.7 meters (5 ft). The leaves have regularly spaced teeth 3–6 mm long and a terminal spine 2–3 cm long.

Like sisal, A.fourcroydes is a sterile hybrid; the ovaries never produce seeds. The plant does produce bulbils that may be planted, but commercial growers prefer to use the frequent suckers, which develop more quickly.

The first person of Spanish descent to document the plant and its usefulness for ropes and other naval utensils was José María Lanz, a Mexican-born engineer in service of the Spanish Navy, who studied henequen in Yucatán in 1783.

In mezcal
Henequen, like other species of agave, is used in the production of mezcal.

Gallery

See also
International Year of Natural Fibres 2009

References

José María Lanz, Observaciones que el alférez de fragata D. José Maria de Lanz, forma sobre la planta nombrada henequen, sus utilidades, y lo conveniente de su fomento, en cumplimiento de la comision con que lo despacho á Yucatan para la inspeccion de la járcia de esta especie, el Sr. D. Francisco de Borja, jefe de escuadra de la real armada, y comandante de las fuerzas maritimas del departamento de la Habana, October 15, 1783; later reprinted in Registro Yucateco, volume 3 (1846), pages 81–95 (digitized by Google)
Howard Scott Gentry, Agaves of Continental North America (University of Arizona Press, 1982) pp. 573–576

External links

Henequen-growing Haciendas in the Yucatan

fourcroydes
Fiber plants
Flora of Mexico
Flora of Guatemala
Plants described in 1864
Crops originating from Mexico